Losten is a surname. Notable people with the surname include:

 Basil H. Losten (born 1930), American Catholic bishop
 Lotta Losten (born 1981), Swedish actress, designer, and photographer

See also

 Loston (disambiguation)
Lotten